Dwight Pelz (born April 1, 1951) is an American politician who served as the Chair of the Washington State Democratic Party from 2006 to 2014. He previously served in the Washington State Senate from the 37th district from 1991 to 1997 and on the King County Council from the 5th district from 1997 to 2006.

References

1951 births
Living people
Democratic Party Washington (state) state senators
King County Councillors
State political party chairs of Washington (state)